Muhammad Jadid bin Ilias (born 21 December 1996) is a Malaysian professional footballer who plays as a centre-back for Sri Pahang.

Career statistics

Club

References

External links
 

1996 births
Living people
People from Pahang
Malaysian footballers
Felda United F.C. players
Sri Pahang FC players
Malaysia Super League players
Malaysian people of Malay descent
Association football defenders